The 1983 European Athletics Indoor Championships were held at Sportcsarnok in Budapest, the capital city of Hungary, on 5 and 6 March 1983.

Medal summary

Men

Women

Medal table

Participating nations

  (8)
  (4)
  (12)
  (18)
  (15)
  (7)
  (19)
  (13)
  (3)
  (31)
  (2)
  (16)
  (3)
  (1)
  (10)
  (1)
  (6)
  (34)
  (10)
  (10)
  (5)
  (3)
  (25)
  (5)

See also
 1983 in athletics (track and field)

References

 Medallists – men at GBRathletics.com
 Medallists – women at GBRathletics.com

 
European Athletics Indoor Championships
European Indoor Championships
International sports competitions in Budapest
International athletics competitions hosted by Hungary
European Athletics Indoor Championships
European Athletics Indoor Championships
1980s in Budapest